Rod Branch (born April 14, 1975) is a Canadian former professional ice hockey goaltender. During his eight seasons in the Central Hockey League (CHL), Branch posted 22 shutouts to retire as the CHL's all-time career shut-out leader.

Born in Fort St. John, British Columbia, Branch played four seasons (1992–1996) of major junior hockey in the Western Hockey League. He turned professional during the 1996–97 season, and went on to play ten seasons of pro hockey, including six seasons with the Tulsa Oilers of the Central Hockey League.

Awards and honours

References

External links
 

1975 births
Living people
Calgary Hitmen players
Canadian expatriate ice hockey players in the United States
Canadian ice hockey goaltenders
Ice hockey people from British Columbia
Kamloops Blazers players
Motor City Mechanics players
New Mexico Scorpions (WPHL) players
Oklahoma City Blazers (1992–2009) players
People from Fort St. John, British Columbia
Prince Albert Raiders players
Topeka Scarecrows players
Tulsa Oilers (1992–present) players